is a Japanese former competitive figure skater. He is a four-time Japanese national champion and placed 14th at the 1984 Winter Olympics. After retiring from competition, he became a doctor of dental surgery.

Results

References 

1964 births
Living people
Japanese male single skaters
Olympic figure skaters of Japan
Figure skaters at the 1984 Winter Olympics
Sportspeople from Tokyo
Fellows of the American Physical Society